Nuritamburia semicinereana is a moth of the family Tortricidae. It was first described by Otto Swezey in 1913. It is endemic to the island of Hawaii.

External links

Archipini
Endemic moths of Hawaii